Murder in the Air may refer to:

Radio, television and film 
 Murder in the Air (film), a 1940 film starring Ronald Reagan
 "Murder in the Air" (Diagnosis: Murder), an episode of Diagnosis: Murder
 Death in the Air,  also known as Murder in the Air, a 1936 American film
 Sky Dragon, also known as Murder in the Air, a 1949 mystery film
 "Murder in the Air", an episode of Inner Sanctum

Literature 
 Murder in the Air, a novel in the Sophie Greenway series by Ellen Hart
 Murder in the Air, a 2010 novel by Bill Crider
 Murder in the Air, a 1943 novel by Archibald Thomas Pechey
 Murder in the Air, a 1935 novel by Alfred Oliver Pollard
 Murder in the Air, a 1931 novel by Darwin Teilhet

Music 
 "Murder in the Air", a 12" single by Lol Coxhill